Rina Asunción Campain Brambilla is an Ecuadorian politician for the Creating Opportunities (CREO) party.

Life 
She was born in about 1983.

During the time when Campain was the only woman who was both in the Creating Opportunities party and in the National Assembly she had Nathalie Arias on her staff as a legislative advisor. Arias would go on to join her as a fellow assembly member after Campain was reelected in 2021.

Campain represents the Province of Esmeraldas.

References 

Living people
Members of the National Congress (Ecuador)
Members of the National Assembly (Ecuador)
21st-century Ecuadorian politicians
21st-century Ecuadorian women politicians
Women members of the National Assembly (Ecuador)
Year of birth missing (living people)